The 1987-88 NBA season was the Bucks' 20th season in the NBA. The Bucks finished fourth in the Central Division with a 42–40 record. In the first round of the playoffs, they lost in five games to the Atlanta Hawks. This was also their final season playing at MECCA Arena.

Draft picks

Roster

Regular season

Season standings

z - clinched division title
y - clinched division title
x - clinched playoff spot

Record vs. opponents

Game log

|-style="background:#fcc;"
| 1 || November 6, 1987 || @ Boston
| L 108–125
|Terry Cummings (26)
|
|
| Boston Garden
| 0—1
|-style="background:#cfc;"
| 2 || November 7, 19878:00 PM CST || Detroit
| W 119–105
|Jack Sikma (26)
|Jack Sikma (18)
|
| MECCA Arena 11,052
| 1–1
|-style="background:#bbffbb;"
| 3 || November 10, 1987 || Washington
| W 115–100
|
|
|
| MECCA Arena
| 2–1
|-style="background:#bbffbb;"
| 4 || November 11, 1987 || @ Cleveland
| W 107–101
|
|
|
| Richfield Coliseum
| 3-1
|-style="background:#fcc;"
| 5 || November 14, 1987 || @ New York
| L 89–93
|
|
|
| Madison Square Garden
| 3-2
|-style="background:#bbffbb;"
| 6 || November 15, 1987 || Atlanta
| W 112–103
|
|
|
| MECCA Arena
| 4–2
|-style="background:#bbffbb;"
| 7 || November 17, 1987 || Golden State
| W 120–108
|
|
|
| MECCA Arena
| 5–2
|-style="background:#bbffbb;"
| 8 || November 19, 1987 || @ Sacramento
| W 117–113
|
|
|
| ARCO Arena I
| 6-2
|-style="background:#fcc;"
| 9 || November 20, 1987 || @ Seattle
| L 97–99
|
|
|
| Seattle Center Coliseum
| 6-3
|-style="background:#cfc;"
| 10 || November 22, 19879:30 PM CST || @ L. A. Lakers
| W 124–116 (OT)
|
|
|
| The Forum17,505
| 7–3
|-style="background:#fcc;"
| 11 || November 25, 1987 || Chicago
| L 101–103
|
|
|
| MECCA Arena
| 7–4
|-style="background:#bbffbb;"
| 12 || November 28, 1987 || Boston
| W 112–97
|
|
|
| MECCA Arena
| 8–4
|-style="background:#bbffbb;"
| 13 || November 30, 1987 || Indiana
| W 104–94
|
|
|
| MECCA Arena
| 9–4

|-style="background:#fcc;"
| 14 || December 2, 19876:30 PM CST || @ Detroit
| L 105–115
|
|
|
| Pontiac Silverdome18,780
| 9–4
|-style="background:#cfc;"
| 15 || December 4, 19877:00 PM CST || L. A. Lakers
| W 85–83
|
|
|
| MECCA Arena11,052
| 10–5
|-style="background:#fcc;"
| 16 || December 8, 1987 || @ Indiana
| L 101–103
|
|
|
| Market Square Arena
| 10–6
|-style="background:#fcc;"
| 17 || December 10, 1987 || @ Chicago
| L 105–111
|
|
|
| Chicago Stadium
| 10–7
|-style="background:#bbffbb;"
| 18 || December 11, 1987 || Portland
| W 125–112
|
|
|
| MECCA Arena
| 11–7
|-style="background:#fcc;"
| 19 || December 13, 19877:30 PM CST || Dallas
| L 99–113
|
|
|
| MECCA Arena11,052
| 11–8
|-style="background:#bbffbb;"
| 20 || December 15, 1987 || @ New York
| W 103–98
|
|
|
| Madison Square Garden
| 12–8
|-style="background:#fcc;"
| 21 || December 18, 1987 || Atlanta
| L 87–94
|
|
|
| MECCA Arena
| 12–9
|-style="background:#bbffbb;"
| 22 || December 22, 1987 || New York
| W 122–105
|
|
|
| MECCA Arena
| 13–9
|-style="background:#bbffbb;"
| 23 || December 26, 1987 || Washington
| W 102–97
|
|
|
| MECCA Arena
| 14–9
|-style="background:#bbffbb;"
| 24 || December 29, 1987 || @ New Jersey
| W 106–88
|
|
|
| Brendan Byrne Arena
| 15–9
|-style="background:#fcc;"
| 25 || December 30, 1987 || Houston
| L 93–102
|
|
|
| MECCA Arena
| 15–10

|-style="background:#fcc;"
| 26 || January 2, 1988 || Indiana
| L 97–99
|
|
|
| MECCA Arena
| 15–11
|-style="background:#bbffbb;"
| 27 || January 5, 1988 || L. A. Clippers
| W 98–82
|
|
|
| MECCA Arena
| 16–11
|-style="background:#fcc;"
| 28 || January 7, 1988 || @ Indiana
| L 108–114
|
|
|
| Market Square Arena
| 16–12
|-style="background:#fcc;"
| 29 || January 8, 1988 || Utah
| L 107–111
|
|
|
| MECCA Arena
| 16–13
|-style="background:#bbffbb;"
| 30 || January 10, 1988 || New Jersey
| W 105–87
|
|
|
| MECCA Arena
| 17–13
|-style="background:#bbffbb;"
| 31 || January 12, 1988 || Philadelphia
| W 106–103
|
|
|
| MECCA Arena
| 18–13
|-style="background:#fcc;"
| 32 || January 14, 1988 || @ Washington
| L 107–136
|
|
|
| Capital Centre
| 18–14
|-style="background:#bbffbb;"
| 33 || January 17, 1988 || Cleveland
| W 111–93
|
|
|
| MECCA Arena
| 19–14
|-style="background:#fcc;"
| 34 || January 19, 1988 || @ San Antonio
| L 107–136
|
|
|
| HemisFair Arena
| 19–15
|-style="background:#fcc;"
| 35 || January 21, 1988 || @ Houston
| L 103–116
|
|
|
| The Summit
| 19–16
|-style="background:#fcc;"
| 36 || January 23, 19887:30 PM CST || @ Dallas
| L 97–113
|
|
|
| Reunion Arena17,007
| 19–17
|-style="background:#bbffbb;"
| 37 || January 25, 1988 || @ Golden State
| W 108–105
|
|
|
| Oakland-Alameda County Coliseum Arena
| 20–17
|-style="background:#fcc;"
| 38 || January 26, 1988 || @ Portland
| L 106–112
|
|
|
| Memorial Coliseum
| 20–18
|-style="background:#fcc;"
| 39 || January 28, 1988 || @ Denver
| L 113–122
|
|
|
| McNichols Sports Arena
| 20–19
|-style="background:#bbffbb;"
| 40 || January 29, 1988 || @ L. A. Clippers
| W 97–88
|
|
|
| Los Angeles Memorial Sports Arena
| 21–19

|-style="background:#fcc;"
| 41 || February 2, 19887:30 PM CST || Detroit
| L 97–99
|
|
|
| MECCA Arena 11,052
| 21–20
|-style="background:#fcc;"
| 44 || February 11, 1988 || @ Philadelphia
| L 113–119 OT
|
|
|
| The Spectrum
| 23–21
|-style="background:#cfc;"
| 48 || February 19, 19888:00 PM CST || Detroit
| W 119–108
|
|
|
| MECCA Arena 11,052
| 26–22

|-style="background:#fcc;"
| 56 || March 6, 19886:00 PM CST || @ Detroit
| L 99–109
|
|
|
| Pontiac Silverdome24,751
| 31–25
|-style="background:#bbffbb;"
| 67 || March 26, 1988 || @ Utah
| W 107–105
|
|
|
| Salt Palace
| 38–29

|-style="background:#fcc;"
| 77 || April 15, 19887:00 PM CST || @ Detroit
| L 91–92
|
|
|
| Pontiac Silverdome27,126
| 40–37
|-style="background:#bbffbb;"
| 81 || April 22, 1988 || New York
| W 118–109
|
|
|
| MECCA Arena
| 42–39

Playoffs

|- align="center" bgcolor="#ffcccc"
| 1
| April 29
| @ Atlanta
| L 107–110
| Paul Pressey (21)
| Jack Sikma (12)
| Paul Pressey (7)
| Omni Coliseum11,517
| 0–1
|- align="center" bgcolor="#ffcccc"
| 2
| May 1
| @ Atlanta
| L 97–104
| Sidney Moncrief (22)
| Jack Sikma (17)
| Paul Pressey (9)
| Omni Coliseum11,777
| 0–2
|- align="center" bgcolor="#ccffcc"
| 3
| May 4
| Atlanta
| W 123–115
| Terry Cummings (30)
| Jack Sikma (16)
| Paul Pressey (6)
| MECCA Arena11,052
| 1–2
|- align="center" bgcolor="#ccffcc"
| 4
| May 6
| Atlanta
| W 105–99
| Terry Cummings (30)
| Jack Sikma (9)
| Sidney Moncrief (7)
| MECCA Arena11,052
| 2–2
|- align="center" bgcolor="#ffcccc"
| 5
| May 8
| @ Atlanta
| L 111–121
| Terry Cummings (28)
| Larry Krystkowiak (10)
| Moncrief, Pressey (6)
| Omni Coliseum12,190
| 2–3
|-

Player statistics
Source:

Season

Playoffs

Awards and records

Transactions

Trades

Free agents

References

See also
 1987-88 NBA season

Milwaukee Bucks seasons
Milwaukee
Milwaukee Bucks
Milwaukee Bucks